Emil Freymark (March 4, 1876 – May 26, 1936) was an American track and field athlete who competed in the 1904 Summer Olympics. In 1904 he was fifth in high jump competition. He was born and died in St. Louis, Missouri.

References

External links
list of American athletes
Emil Freymark's profile at Sports Reference.com

1876 births
1936 deaths
American male high jumpers
Olympic track and field athletes of the United States
Athletes (track and field) at the 1904 Summer Olympics
Olympic male high jumpers